New Iberia is the largest city in and parish seat of Iberia Parish in the U.S. state of Louisiana. The 2020 United States census tabulated a population of 28,555. New Iberia is served by a major four lane highway, being U.S. 90 (future Interstate 49), and has its own general aviation airfield, Acadiana Regional Airport. Scheduled passenger and cargo airline service is available via the nearby Lafayette Regional Airport located adjacent to U.S. 90 in Lafayette.

History

New Iberia dates its founding to the spring of 1779, when a group of some 500 colonists (Malagueños) from Spain, led by Lt. Col. Francisco Bouligny, came up Bayou Teche and settled around what became known as Spanish Lake.

The Spanish settlers called the town "Nueva Iberia" in honor of the Iberian Peninsula; French-speakers referred to the town as "Nouvelle Ibérie" while the English settlers arriving after the Louisiana Purchase called it "New Town." In 1814, the U.S. government opened a post office in the town, officially recognizing the name as New Iberia, but postmarks from 1802 show the town being called “Nova Iberia” (Latin for "new"). The town was incorporated as the "Town of Iberia" in 1839, but the state legislature amended the town's charter in 1847, recognizing New Iberia as the town's name.

During the American Civil War, New Iberia was occupied by Union forces under General Nathaniel P. Banks. The soldiers spent the winter of 1862–1863 at New Iberia and, according to historian John D. Winters of Louisiana Tech University in his The Civil War in Louisiana, "found the weather each day more and more severe. The dreary days dragged by, and the men grumbled as they plowed through the freezing rain and deep mud in performing the regular routines of camp life." Banks' men from New Iberia foraged for supplies in the swamps near the city.

In 1868, Iberia Parish was established, and New Iberia became the seat of parish government. At first, only rented space served for the courthouse. State senator Samuel Wakefield and his family fled to New Orleans after their son was lynched by a white mob. By 1884 a new courthouse was completed on a landscaped lot in downtown New Iberia, at the present-day site of Bouligny Plaza. That courthouse served Iberia Parish until 1940. That year the current courthouse was built along Iberia Street, two blocks from the New Iberia downtown commercial district.

In September 2008, New Iberia was struck by Hurricane Ike. The lakes overflowed and filled the city, flooding it under several feet of dirty, brown water. On December 14, 2022, the southeastern part of the city was heavily damaged by a high-end EF2 tornado, injuring 16 people.

Geography
New Iberia is located in southern Louisiana, in the Acadiana region. The city of New Iberia is a part of the Lafayette metropolitan area. According to the United States Census Bureau, the city has a total area of 10.6 square miles (27.4 km2), all land. New Iberia lies approximately 16 to 20 feet above sea level.

There is also Lake Tasse, better known as Spanish Lake. This region has many natural features of interest, such as Avery Island, famous for its Tabasco sauce factory, deposits of rock salt, and Jungle Gardens.

Climate 
New Iberia enjoys a sub-tropical climate with above average rainfall.

Demographics

As of the 2020 United States census, there were 28,555 people, 11,030 households, and 7,338 families residing in the city. The 2019 American Community Survey estimated 29,456 people resided in the city limits. At the 2010 U.S. census, the population of New Iberia was 30,617. At the census of 2000, there were 32,623 people, 11,756 households, and 8,335 families residing in the city.

Of the population in 2019, New Iberians lived in 13,455 housing units; there were 11,030 households. New Iberia's population had a sex ratio of 96.2 males per 100 females. The city had a median age of 36.2 and 7,671 were under 18 years of age, 2,609 under 5 years, and 21,785 aged 18 and older. An estimated 4,268 households were married-couples living together, 784 cohabiting households, 2,273 male households with no female present, and 3,705 female households with no male present. The average household size was 2.63 and the average family size was 3.24.

In 2000, there were 11,756 households, out of which 36.6% had children under the age of 18 living with them, 45.1% were married couples living together, 20.5% had a female householder with no husband present, and 29.1% were non-families. 25.2% of all households were made up of individuals, and 10.8% had someone living alone who was 65 years of age or older. The average household size was 2.70 and the average family size was 3.24. In the city, the population was spread out, with 29.8% under the age of 18, 9.7% from 18 to 24, 26.8% from 25 to 44, 20.4% from 45 to 64, and 13.3% who were 65 years of age or older. The median age was 34 years. For every 100 females, there were 87.8 males. For every 100 females age 18 and over, there were 83.6 males.

The 2019 census estimates determined New Iberia a median income of $38,221 and mean income of $54,126. At the 2000 census, the median income for a household in the city was $26,079, and the median income for a family was $30,828. Males had a median income of $30,289 versus $16,980 for females. The per capita income for the city was $13,084. About 24.9% of families and 29.5% of the population were below the poverty line, including 40.8% of those under age 18 and 20.8% of those age 65 or over.

Race and ethnicity 
New Iberia had a racial and ethnic makeup of 51.6% non-Hispanic whites, 40.7% Blacks or African Americans, 0.1% American Indians and Alaska Natives, 1.4% Asian, 2.1% some other race, and 2.1% multiracial Americans. Hispanics or Latino Americans of any race made up 3.8% of the total population in 2019. After the 2020 census, its racial and ethnic makeup was 44.47% non-Hispanic white, 44.04% Black or African American, 0.26% American Indian and Alaska Native, 2.8% Asian, <0.0 Pacific Islander, 3.37% two or more races, and 5.06% Hispanic or Latino American of any race. At the 2000 census, the racial makeup of the city was 56.99% White, 38.42% African American, 0.21% Native American, 2.64% Asian, 0.02% Pacific Islander, 0.51% from other races, and 1.20% from two or more races; 1.49% of the population were Hispanic or Latino American of any race.

Religion 
In common with most of Louisiana, the majority of New Iberians profess a religion. New Iberia is dominated by Christianity, and the single largest Christian denomination in the city is the Roman Catholic Church, owing in part to the Spanish and French heritage of its residents. Catholics in New Iberia and the surrounding area are served by the Roman Catholic Diocese of Lafayette in Louisiana. Of the religious population, 0.1% each practice Judaism or an eastern religion.

Economy 
The city of New Iberia was the founding headquarters for Bruce Foods before their relocation to Lafayette; it was also the birthplace of Trappey's Hot Sauce. Currently, the economy is stimulated by small businesses, agriculture, New Iberia station, Louisiana Hot Sauce, and Acadiana Regional Airport.

Arts and culture

Places of interest 
 Shadows-on-the-Teche historic former residence and plantation, now owned by the National Trust for Historic Preservation.
The Bayou Teche Museum has exhibits on the history, culture, artists and industries of the Bayou Teche region. Location of artist George Rodrigue's last studio.
Avery Island, home of Tabasco sauce and claims to be the oldest salt mine in North America. In operation since 1862.
Jungle Gardens, botanical garden and bird sanctuary located in Avery Island.
Jefferson Island is a former salt mine, botanical garden, rookery, nursery, as well as the historic Victorian Joseph Jefferson House.
Conrad Rice Mill is on the National Register of Historic Places, oldest rice mill in operation since 1912, offering public tours.
The city used to hold a statue of the Roman emperor, Hadrian. It was located on the corner of Weeks and St. Peter Streets, until approx. 2008 when it was sold.

Festivals
New Iberia hosts the Louisiana Sugar Cane Festival in September. The Sugar Cane Festival celebrates the commencement of the sugar cane harvest, locally referred to as grinding. Sugar cane is a principal crop grown by New Iberia farmers. The city also hosts El Festival Español de Nueva Iberia, which honors the area's Spanish heritage. Other notable festivals include the World Championship Gumbo Cook-Off, on the second full weekend in October; and the Books Along the Teche Literary Festival, in April, which celebrates James Lee Burke and South Louisiana literature.

Popular culture 
New Iberia is home to fictional detective Dave Robicheaux and his creator, author James Lee Burke. In the Electric Mist, a movie based on one of Burke's novels, was filmed in New Iberia in 2009 and starred Tommy Lee Jones.

Education

Public schools 
Iberia Parish School System serves the city and parish area.

High schools

Middle schools

Elementary schools

Private schools

Colleges and universities
Iberia Parish is in the service area of Fletcher Technical Community College and of South Louisiana Community College.

Notable people
This is a list of notable people from New Iberia, Louisiana. It includes people who were born/raised in, lived in, or spent portions of their lives in New Iberia, or for whom New Iberia is a significant part of their identity. This list is in order by career and in alphabetical order by last name.

Actors 

 Joseph Jefferson, artist and stage actor, portrayed the role of Rip Van Winkle and built the Jefferson Mansion as a hunting lodge on Jefferson Island in 1870. 

Yvonne Levy Kushner, French-Jewish American actress, socialite and philanthropist, born in New Iberia.

Authors and journalists

Artists and designers

Business

Politics and civil service

Music

Sports

Science 
Norman F. Carnahan, chemical engineer

Sister cities

See also
 Louisiana Hot Sauce – a hot sauce brand manufactured in New Iberia
National Register of Historic Places listings in Iberia Parish, Louisiana

References

External links

 City of New Iberia

 
1779 establishments in New Spain
Acadiana
Cities in Louisiana
Parish seats in Louisiana
Cities in Iberia Parish, Louisiana
Populated places established in 1779
Spanish-American culture in Louisiana
Cities in Lafayette, Louisiana metropolitan area